George Merrill (16 August 1867 – 16 January 1928) was the life partner of Edward Carpenter, an English utopian socialist, poet, philosopher and early activist for gay rights.

Merrill was a working-class man who was born and grew up in the slums of Sheffield; he had no formal education. He met Edward Carpenter on a train in 1891, and moved into Carpenter's home, a small holding at Millthorpe, Derbyshire, in February 1898, when Carpenter's previous domestic help, George Adams and his family, moved out when Adams retired. Merrill arrived at Millthorpe in a blizzard, "trundling with the help of two boys all his worldly goods in a handcart over the hills, and through a disheartening blizzard of snow." His arrival was commemorated by Carpenter in the poem "Hafiz to the Cupbearer", part of Carpenter's Towards Democracy which was published in stages between 1882 and 1902.

Merrill had previously worked in a newspaper office, a hotel, and in an ironworks. He was always officially Carpenter's servant, and he undertook the cooking and cleaning in the home, decorating and placing flowers in every room. Carpenter noted that "George in fact was accepted and one may say beloved by both my manual worker friends and my more aristocratic friends." He had a fine baritone voice and liked to sing comical songs.

The two lived openly as a couple for almost forty years, until Merrill's death in 1928. Carpenter died the following year and was buried beside Merrill at the Mount Cemetery in Guildford, Surrey.

The relationship between Carpenter and Merrill was the inspiration for E. M. Forster's novel Maurice, and the character of the gamekeeper Alec Scudder was in part modelled after George Merrill. The novelist D. H. Lawrence read the manuscript of Maurice, which was not published until after Forster's death. The manuscript and Carpenter and Merrill's rural lifestyle influenced Lawrence's 1928 novel Lady Chatterley's Lover, which also involves a gamekeeper becoming the lover of a member of the upper classes.

Gallery

References

External links

 
 Edward Carpenter, George Merrill, a true history, & study in psychology (1913). Transcription of the unpublished typescript.
 Edward Carpenter, My days and dreams, being autobiographical notes, Allen & Unwin, 1916, chapter 9.

1867 births
1928 deaths
English LGBT people
British LGBT rights activists
People from Sheffield
19th-century British LGBT people
20th-century LGBT people